Tea Faa'tea Ropati (born 7 September 1964) is a former professional rugby league footballer who represented New Zealand and Western Samoa.

Background
Ropati was born in Auckland, New Zealand.

Ropati is a member of the large Ropati rugby league family that includes fellow league players Joe Ropati, John Ropati, Iva Ropati, union player Romi Ropati, and league commentator Peter Ropati.

Early years
Ropati played for both the Mangere East Hawks and Otahuhu Leopards in the Auckland Rugby League competition. He was a Junior Kiwi in 1983.

During the 1987 season Ropati played for Auckland alongside three of his brothers; John, Joe and Peter.

This feat was bettered in the 1991 season when all four of them, plus brother Iva, twice lined up for Mangere East in the Auckland Rugby League competition.

Playing career
Ropati started his professional career with the Newcastle Knights in 1988 before moving to England. Playing for St. Helens he made a name for himself as a centre/five eighth who kicked goals. He also won the 1992/3 British First Division player of the year award.

During the 1991–92 season he played in St. Helens' 24–14 victory over Rochdale Hornets in the 1991 Lancashire County Cup Final at Wilderspool Stadium, Warrington, on 20 October 1991.

In 1995 he returned home to join the new Auckland Warriors in the first Australian Rugby League premiership. He was the Warriors' player of the year in 1995. He stayed with the Warriors for four seasons before retiring after the 1998 season.

Ropati represented the New Zealand national rugby league team between 1996 and 1997 and also played for Western Samoa at the 1995 Rugby League World Cup.

Later years
Ropati participated in the charity boxing event Fight for Life on several occasions during the early 2000s.

In 2010 Ropati was the assistant coach for the Mangere East Hawks in the Auckland Rugby League competition.

Rape trial
On 21 January 2008 Ropati began a trial in Auckland on charges of rape and unlawful sexual connection, to which he pleaded not guilty. The woman stated she awoke in a car near Victoria Park. "I remember coming to. I remember an angry face over me. It was an angry, twisted face. I remember being in pain." Ropati was married at the time, and although he admitted the sexual connection he stated that it was consensual.

On 31 January 2008 a jury found him not guilty on all six charges. Multiple rugby league personalities defended the character of Ropati in court including the Mad Butcher Peter Leitch.

References

External links
Biography at Saints Heritage Society

1964 births
Living people
Auckland rugby league team players
Junior Kiwis players
Mangere East Hawks players
New Zealand national rugby league team players
New Zealand sportspeople of Samoan descent
New Zealand rugby league coaches
New Zealand rugby league players
New Zealand Warriors players
Newcastle Knights players
Otahuhu Leopards players
People educated at Otahuhu College
Tea
Rugby league centres
Rugby league five-eighths
Rugby league players from Auckland
Samoa national rugby league team players
Samoan rugby league players
St Helens R.F.C. players